Dion Myers (born 21 March 2002) is a Zimbabwean cricketer. He made his international debut for the Zimbabwe cricket team in July 2021.

Career
Myers made his first-class debut on 9 December 2020, for Mountaineers, in the 2020–21 Logan Cup. Prior to his first-class debut, he was named in Zimbabwe's squad for the 2020 Under-19 Cricket World Cup. He made his Twenty20 debut on 10 April 2021, for Mountaineers, in the 2020–21 Zimbabwe Domestic Twenty20 Competition. He made his List A debut on 18 April 2021, for Mountaineers, in the 2020–21 Pro50 Championship. 

In May 2021, he earned his maiden call up to the Zimbabwe A cricket team for the List A series against South Africa A. In the first match of the series, he scored 96 runs, which was also his first half-century in List A cricket.

In July 2021, Myers was named in Zimbabwe's Test squad for their one-off match against Bangladesh. He made his Test debut on 7 July 2021, for Zimbabwe against Bangladesh. In July 2021, Myers was named in Zimbabwe's One Day International (ODI) squad, also for their series against Bangladesh. Myers made his ODI debut on 16 July 2021, for Zimbabwe against Bangladesh. After the conclusion of the ODI matches, Myers was also named in Zimbabwe's Twenty20 International (T20I) for the matches against Bangladesh. Myers made his T20I debut on 22 July 2021, also for Zimbabwe against Bangladesh.

References

External links
 

2002 births
Living people
Zimbabwean cricketers
Zimbabwe Test cricketers
Zimbabwe One Day International cricketers
Zimbabwe Twenty20 International cricketers
Mountaineers cricketers
Cricketers from Harare